Jeni Lidgett (born 19 November 1964) is an Australian sailor. She competed in the women's two-person 470 dinghy class for Australia at two Olympic Games.

Lidgett learnt to sail at the Davey's Bay Yacht Club where her father was commodore.

At the Barcelona 1992 Olympics, as skipper with Addy Bucek as crew, she finished 9th in the 470 event. At Savannah, Georgia, the 1996 Olympic sailing venue, she and Bucek finished 7th in the 470 event.

The 470 World Championships in Toronto, Canada 1995 saw Lidgett and Bucek finish 12th.

Personal 
Lidgett was born in Melbourne on 17 November 1964, daughter of Athol and Julie Lidgett. She is married to Peter Danks and has two sons, Samuel and David, and one daughter, Edwardo.

References 

1964 births
Living people
Australian female sailors (sport)
Sailors at the 1992 Summer Olympics – 470
Sailors at the 1996 Summer Olympics – 470
Olympic sailors of Australia
Sportspeople from Melbourne
20th-century Australian women